Marguerite Brouzet, Vicomtesse de Bonnemains (19 December 1855 – 16 July 1891) was the mistress of Georges Boulanger.  A few months after her death, Georges Boulanger committed suicide on her grave.

Personal information
Caroline Laurence Marguerite Brouzet was born into a wealthy bourgeois family. In 1874, she married Vicomte Charles-Marie Pierre de Bonnemains (1851-1916), the son of General Charles-Frédéric de Bonnemains. Therefore, she is also referred to as Madame de Bonnemains. The marriage failed and the couple was divorced in 1888. Brouzet became the lover of the French general and minister Boulanger and died of tuberculosis in his arms in July 1891. At his request, ″A bientôt″ (″See you soon″) was engraved on her tomb. Two months later he shot himself in front of her grave. His first name and ″Ai-je bien pu vivre 2 mois et 1/2 sans toi!″ (″Was I really able to live two and a half months without you!″) were added to the epitaph.

References

External links
Photography on gallica BnF
Photography  l'Americain illustré (1891)
Family tree on geneanet

1855 births
1891 deaths
19th-century French women
19th-century deaths from tuberculosis
Tuberculosis deaths in Belgium